Tajud is a small island in the Philippines located on the north coast of Mindoro island. It is located in the Occidental Mindoro province of the Philippines.

See also

 List of islands of the Philippines

References

Islands of Occidental Mindoro